George Andrew Thomason (born 12 January 2001) is an English professional footballer who plays as a midfielder for League One side Bolton Wanderers.

Playing career
Thomason spent his most of youth as a left-back at Blackpool signing as an 8 year old but was released as a 16 year old.

After signing for Longridge Town he was converted into a central midfielder by Lee Ashcroft and scored two goals in 26 league appearances in the North West Counties League for Longridge Town in the 2019–20 season, before being signed by Bolton Wanderers in January 2020. As part of the deal, Bolton agreed to play a pre-season friendly against Longridge Town the following season though instead, the match happened during pre season for 2021–2022 season, presumably to allow fans to attend as the entire 2020–2021 season was played behind closed doors. The match finished 3–1 to Bolton, with Thomason playing 45 minutes.

On 31 January 2020 he was loaned out to Northern Premier League Premier Division club Bamber Bridge. He returned to Bamber Bridge the following season, alongside team mate Callum King-Harmes, before being recalled in November as non-League football was suspended due to the COVID-19 pandemic in England. He made his debut for the "Trotters" on 17 November 2020, in a 3–2 victory over Newcastle United U21 in the EFL Trophy. He made his English Football League debut on 5 December, in a 6–3 home defeat to Port Vale. On 26 December 2020 he scored his first Bolton goal, and his first professional goal, scoring Bolton's first goal in a 3–3 draw against Carlisle United. His performances in December saw him voted by the Bolton fans as Bolton Player of the Month. On 12 February 2021, he signed a new 18 month contract. On 21 May 2021 he was named Bolton's Young Player of the Year for the 2020–21 season. On 5 November, he signed a one year contract extension extending it to 2023. On 2 December 2022, in a match against Bristol Rovers, Thomason went off injured with the injury possibly ruling him out for the rest of the season. Two weeks later, on 15 December, he signed a new contract with Bolton until 2025 with the option of an extra year. He returned much earlier than expected however, returning to training in February.

Style of play
Thomason is a box-to-box midfielder. Bolton manager Ian Evatt said that Thomason has excellent positioning skills, vision and has a "wonderful left foot".

Statistics

Notes

Honours
Longridge Town
 North West Counties Football League Division One North: 2018–19

Bolton Wanderers
EFL League Two third-place (promotion): 2020–21

References

2001 births
Living people
Footballers from Barrow-in-Furness
English footballers
Association football midfielders
Blackpool F.C. players
Longridge Town F.C. players
Bolton Wanderers F.C. players
Bamber Bridge F.C. players
North West Counties Football League players
Northern Premier League players
English Football League players
Footballers from Cumbria